Alexander Blair was a Scottish rugby union player. He was the 36th President of the Scottish Rugby Union. He became a Colonel in the army and then became President of the British Legion and Chairman of the Earl Haig Fund. An advocate to trade he was a Writer to the Signet. He received a CBE in the New Years Honours List of 1933.

Rugby Union career

Amateur career

After attending Loretto School, Blair went to Brasenose College in Oxford. He played for Oxford University, and was in the 1st XV. He was secretary of both the rugby and athletics club of the university.

Administrative career

He was Secretary of the Scottish Rugby Union for 4 years from 1886.

Blair was on the International Rugby Board in 1889.

He became the 36th President of the Scottish Rugby Union. He served one year from 1909 to 1910.

Military career

First as Lieutenant Colonel, then Colonel, Blair commanded the 'Dandy Ninth', the Lothian Regiment of the Royal Scots, in the First World War. In 1916 he was awarded a CMG.

After the war he joined the British Legion where he became treasurer in Scotland.

Law career

Blair's firm, Strathearn and Blair, acted as solicitors for the Scottish Rugby Union. Blair was a Writer to the Signet.

Death

He is buried in Dean Cemetery in Edinburgh.

References

1865 births
1936 deaths
Presidents of the Scottish Rugby Union
Rugby union players from Edinburgh
Scottish rugby union players
Oxford University RFC players
Rugby union three-quarters